Joshua David "Josh" Lakatos (born March 24, 1973) is an American former Olympic target shooter. He was born in Pasadena, California.

Career
At the 1992 Olympic Trials, Lakatos did not make the Olympic team, finishing in seventh place.

At the 1996 Summer Olympics, Lakatos won a silver medal in the trap. At the 2000 Summer Olympics, Lakatos finished in 16th place in the trap.

Stunt career

In the 2019 Joker film, Josh drove the ambulance into the police car towards the end of the film.

References

External links
 

1973 births
Living people
American male sport shooters
United States Distinguished Marksman
Shooters at the 1996 Summer Olympics
Shooters at the 2000 Summer Olympics
Olympic silver medalists for the United States in shooting
Trap and double trap shooters
Medalists at the 1996 Summer Olympics